Eggebek is an Amt ("collective municipality") in the district of Schleswig-Flensburg, in Schleswig-Holstein, Germany. The seat of the Amt is in Eggebek.

The Amt Eggebek consists of the following municipalities:

Eggebek
Janneby 
Jerrishoe 
Jörl 
Langstedt
Sollerup 
Süderhackstedt
Wanderup

Ämter in Schleswig-Holstein